Mustafa Peštalić (born 28 March 1963) is a Bosnian football manager and former goalkeeper who played in several clubs in Yugoslavia, Portugal and Hong Kong.

Playing career

Club
Born in Brčko, SR Bosnia and Herzegovina, back then still part of Yugoslavia, he started playing in local side FK Lokomotiva Brčko before moving to Yugoslav First League side FK Vojvodina in 1982.  However, in two seasons he managed to make only 5 league appearances deciding then to move to Yugoslav Second League side FK Spartak Subotica where he became a regular.  After 2 seasons in Subotica, he played another 2 with same level side HNK Šibenik, before moving in 1988 to FK Sloboda Tuzla making this way a return to the Yugoslav top-flight.  After two seasons in Tuzla, he played with FK Velež Mostar before leaving Yugoslavia in 1991.

In summer 1991 he joined Portuguese side C.F. Estrela da Amadora, and for he next 6 years he will play in Portugal with S.C. Campomaiorense, C.F. União de Lamas and A.D. Camacha.  He left Portugal in 1997 and joined Sing Tao SC playing in the Hong Kong Division 1 and stayed in the club until 1999 when the club was dissolved.

Post-playing career
After retiring, he became a coach.  By February 2012 he was a goalkeeping coach at FK Spartak Subotica in the Serbian SuperLiga.  Afterwards, he became sports director of NK Zvijezda Gradačac (a club playing in the Bosnian Premier League, a post he held until April 2014.

References

1963 births
Living people
People from Brčko District
Association football goalkeepers
Yugoslav footballers
Bosnia and Herzegovina footballers
FK Vojvodina players
FK Spartak Subotica players
HNK Šibenik players
FK Sloboda Tuzla players
FK Velež Mostar players
C.F. Estrela da Amadora players
S.C. Campomaiorense players
C.F. União de Lamas players
A.D. Camacha players
Sing Tao SC players
Yugoslav First League players
Yugoslav Second League players
Liga Portugal 2 players
Segunda Divisão players
Hong Kong First Division League players
Yugoslav expatriate footballers
Expatriate footballers in Portugal
Bosnia and Herzegovina expatriate footballers
Bosnia and Herzegovina expatriate sportspeople in Portugal
Expatriate footballers in Hong Kong
Bosnia and Herzegovina expatriate sportspeople in Hong Kong
Association football goalkeeping coaches